Gibberula lifouana is a species of sea snail, a marine gastropod mollusk, in the family Cystiscidae.

Distribution
This marine species occurs off New Caledonia.

References

 Crosse, H., 1871. Descriptions d'espèces nouvelles. Journal de Conchyliologie 19: 319-325
 Crosse, H., 1872. Description d'espèces inédites provenant de la Nouvelle-Calédonie. Journal de Conchyliologie 20: 62-69
 Boyer F., 2003. The Cystiscidae (Caenogastropoda) from upper reef formations of New Caledonia. Iberus 21(1): 241-272

lifouana
Gastropods described in 1871